The Boca Grande Bike Path is a 6.5 mile multi-use path in Boca Grande, Florida on Gasparilla Island.  The northern portion of the path runs on the former right of way of the Charlotte Harbor and Northern Railway, which operated on Gasparilla Island from 1907 to 1981.  As Florida's first rail trail, it was principally built for bicycles, but pedestrians also use it.  Golf carts are also permitted on the path.  Another trail exists on the mainland portion of the railroad line known as the Cape Haze Pioneer Trail.

History

The former Charlotte Harbor and Northern Railway was abandoned in 1981 after the closure of the phosphate port on the south end of the island.  Bayard Sharp, an heir of the Du Pont family who controlled the Gasparilla Inn, saw the need for a bike path after one of his employees had been killed on a bicycle on the island.  Sharp managed to acquire the railroad's right of way and built the path on it.  The trail was dedicated on February 23, 1985.  The Gasparilla Island Conservation and Improvement Association, a non-profit organization based on the island, currently operates the path.

Route Description

The Boca Grande Bike Path begins at the north end of Gasparilla Island just south of the Boca Grande Causeway.  It parallels Gasparilla Road from the causeway to downtown Boca Grande, where it runs through the downtown area and passes the historic Charlotte Harbor and Northern Railway Depot.  A little ways south of the depot, the path travels west off the railroad path and continues south along Gulf Boulevard south past Gasparilla Island Lights and terminating at Gasparilla Island State Park.

Points of interest
 Boca Grande Fishing Pier
 Charlotte Harbor and Northern Railway Depot 
 Gasparilla Island Lights
 Gasparilla Island State Park

References

External links
 TrailLink profile for Boca Grande Bike Path
 Boca Grande Rail Trail at 100 Florida Trails
 

Hiking trails in Florida
Rail trails in Florida
Bike paths in Florida
Transportation in Lee County, Florida
Gasparilla Island
1985 establishments in Florida